Emmons Joseph "Chick" Bowen (July 26, 1897 – August 9, 1948) was a Major League Baseball player who played for the New York Giants in .

External links

New York Giants (NL) players
1897 births
1948 deaths
Baseball players from New Haven, Connecticut